5/2 may refer to:
May 2 (month-day date notation)
February 5 (day-month date notation)
 A form of quintuple meter
 The pentagram
 2.5 (disambiguation), 2½, or two and half